Gretha Ferreira (born 23 June 1989 in Pretoria, South Africa) is a South African dressage rider. She competed at the 2018 World Equestrian Games in Tryon, where she placed 66th in the individual dressage competition.

In October 2019, she qualified for the Tokyo Olympics with the South African team during a special Olympic qualifier event in Exloo, Netherlands.

References

External links
 

Living people
1989 births
South African female equestrians
South African dressage riders
South African people of Afrikaner descent